Alienia is a monotypic moth genus of the family Erebidae. Its only species, Alienia flavofascia, is found on Borneo and was described from the Crocker Range National Park in Sabah. Both the genus and the species were first described by Michael Fibiger in 2011.

The wingspan is about 12.5 mm. The forewings are dark brown at the basal part of the costa and yellow across the outer part of all of the basal area and on the postmedial, subterminal and terminal areas, including the fringes. The inner lower two-thirds of the basal area is pure yellow, and all of the medial area except the costa is yellow. The antemedial, postmedial, and subterminal lines are well marked (the last jagged) and the terminal line is indistinct. The hindwings are grey throughout without a discal spot. The underside of both wings is grey with a discal spot.

The only known specimen was collected in a lower mountain forest in early August.

References

Micronoctuini
Monotypic moth genera
Noctuoidea genera
Moths of Borneo